The London Borough of Richmond upon Thames was created in 1965 when, under the London Government Act 1963, the Municipal Borough of Richmond (Surrey), the Municipal Borough of Barnes (also in Surrey) and the Municipal Borough of Twickenham (in Middlesex) were merged to become a new London borough within Greater London.

This is a categorised list of notable people who were born or have lived within the borders of the modern borough (which covers Barnes, East Sheen, Ham, Hampton, Kew, Hampton Hill, Hampton Wick, Mortlake, Petersham, Richmond, St Margarets, Teddington, Twickenham and Whitton). Only people who are sufficiently notable to have individual entries on Wikipedia have been included in the list and, in each instance, their birth or residence has been verified by citations. The list is divided into two main categories – Living people and Historical figures.

People in Barnes

Barnes, in a bend of the River Thames, is in the extreme north-east of the borough (and as such is the closest part of the borough to central London). Its built environment includes a high proportion of 18th- and 19th-century buildings in the streets near Barnes Pond. Together these make up the Barnes Village conservation area where along with its west riverside most of the mid-19th century properties are concentrated. Its past residents include the composer Gustav Holst (1874–1934) and Ninette de Valois (1898–2001), founder of the Royal Ballet. They each lived in houses on The Terrace, Barnes which are marked by blue plaques.

People in East Sheen

East Sheen was a hamlet in the parish of Mortlake. It became a fashionable suburb in the 19th century. Its notable residents include Sir Tim Berners-Lee (born 1955), computer scientist and inventor of the World Wide Web, who grew up there and attended Sheen Mount Primary School. A mosaic by Sue Edkins was placed at Sheen Lane Centre in June 2013 to commemorate his association with East Sheen.

People in Ham

Ham's main feature is Ham Common which has a cricket pitch, a pond and woodland. A straight tree-lined path leads from Ham Common to Ham House, the most significant house in Ham. Several notable period houses in Ham cluster around the Common including the Cassel Hospital, Langham House and Ormeley Lodge, which is currently owned by Lady Annabel Goldsmith. Victorian buildings include Latchmere House. In contrast, Langham House Close, to the west of Ham Common, completed in 1958, is an early example of Brutalist architecture and just to the north of Ham Parade is Parkleys. Started in 1954 and completed in 1956, Parkleys was the first large-scale residential development by the pioneering SPAN Developments Ltd of Eric Lyons and Geoffrey Townsend.

Past residents include John Henry Newman, later Cardinal Newman (1801–1890), who spent some of his early years at Grey Court, Ham Street, Ham. The site is marked by a blue plaque.

People in Hampton

Hampton, on the north bank of the Thames, includes Hampton Court Palace. The mathematician and computer scientist Alan Turing (1912–1954) lived at Ivy House (which now has a blue plaque) in Hampton High Street between 1945 and 1947 while working at the National Physical Laboratory in Teddington.

People in Kew

Kew is the location of the Royal Botanic Gardens ("Kew Gardens"), now a World Heritage Site, which includes Kew Palace. Successive Tudor, Stuart and Georgian monarchs maintained links with Kew. During the French Revolution, many refugees established themselves there and it was the home of several artists in the 18th and 19th centuries.

Most of Kew developed in the late 19th century, following the arrival of what is now the  London Underground's District line. Further development took place in the 1920s and 1930s when new houses were built on the market gardens of North Sheen, and in the first decade of the 21st century when considerably more river-fronting flats and houses were constructed next to the River Thames on land formerly owned by Thames Water.

People in Mortlake

Mortlake is on the south bank of the Thames between Kew and Barnes. Historically it was part of Surrey and until 1965 was in the Municipal Borough of Barnes. For many centuries it had village status and extended far to the south, to include East Sheen and part of what is now Richmond Park. Its Stuart and Georgian history was economically one of malting, brewing, farming, water transport and tapestry.

Mortlake's most famous former resident is John Dee (1527–1608/09), mathematician, astronomer, astrologer, alchemist and adviser to Queen Elizabeth I. He lived at Mortlake from 1565 to 1595 except for the six years between 1583 and 1589 when he was travelling in Europe. His house no longer exists but it became the Mortlake Tapestry Works and at the end of the 18th century was a girls' school.

People in Petersham

Petersham is a village on the east of the bend in the Thames south of Richmond, which it shares with neighbouring Ham. It provides the foreground of the scenic view from Richmond Hill across Petersham Meadows, with Ham House further along the river.

Past residents include George Vancouver (1757–1798), Captain in the Royal Navy and one of Britain's greatest explorers and navigators, after whom the city of Vancouver in British Columbia, Canada is named. He retired to Petersham, where he wrote A Voyage of Discovery to the North Pacific Ocean, and Round the World while living in what is now called Glen Cottage in River Lane. He died in 1798 and is buried in the churchyard of Petersham Parish Church. The Portland stone monument over his grave, renovated in the 1960s, is now Grade II listed in view of its historical associations.

People in St Margarets

St Margarets takes its name from the former St Margaret's House, which was completed in 1827 although an earlier house of the same name stood on the site. It was the country house of Archibald Kennedy, 1st Marquess of Ailsa and later belonged to Francis Needham, 2nd Earl of Kilmorey, who are commemorated in local street names, including Kilmorey Gardens and Ailsa Road.

Past residents include J. M. W. Turner (1775–1851), the English Romantic painter, printmaker and watercolourist. He commissioned the building of a country retreat on Sandycombe Road which is now known as Turner's House and is open to the public.

People in Teddington

Teddington is on the north bank of the Thames, just after the start of a long meander, between Hampton Wick and Strawberry Hill. Notable past residents include Sir Noël Coward (1899–1973), actor, playwright and songwriter, who was born at 131 Waldegrave Road, Teddington. Teddington Library, which is nearby, has  a bust of Coward, sculpted by Avril Vellacot.

People in Twickenham

Twickenham, the administrative centre of the London Borough of Richmond upon Thames, has an extensive town centre and is the home of rugby union, with hundreds of thousands of spectators visiting Twickenham Stadium, the world's largest rugby stadium, each year. The historic riverside area includes 18th-century buildings and pleasure grounds, many of which survive intact. This area has three grand period mansions with public access: York House, Marble Hill House and Strawberry Hill House. (Another has been lost, that belonging to 18th-century poet Alexander Pope.) Among these is the neo-Gothic prototype home of Horace Walpole which has given its name to a whole district, Strawberry Hill, and is linked with Britain's oldest Roman Catholic university, St Mary's University, Twickenham.

The 1818 Enclosure Award led to the development of land to the west of the town centre largely between the present-day Staines and Hampton Roads, where new roads – Workhouse Road, Middle Road, 3rd, 2nd and 1st Common Roads (now First to Fifth Cross Roads respectively) – were laid out. During the 18th and 19th centuries, a number of fine houses were built and Twickenham became a popular place of residence for people of "fashion and distinction". Further development was stimulated by the opening of Twickenham station in 1848.

People in Whitton

With the royal court often staying in Richmond and Hampton Court in the 18th century, Twickenham and nearby Whitton became a very fashionable place to live and this has left the area with a unique cultural heritage. The only remaining country house left in Whitton is the mid-19th century Kneller Hall. It replaced a house built in 1709 by portrait painter Sir Godfrey Kneller (1646–1723). It was the Royal Military School of Music for more than 150 years, until 2021, when it was announced that the hall would become the Upper School for Radnor House School, Twickenham, currently housed in Pope's villa.

People in Richmond town and Richmond Park

Living people

Actors, broadcasters, entertainers and musicians

Businesspeople

Royals

Sportsmen and sportswomen

Writers and artists

Historical figures

Actors, broadcasters, entertainers and musicians

Businesspeople

Criminals and sinners

Lawyers, politicians and statesmen

Royals: at the Manor of Shene/ Richmond Palace

Royals: in Old Deer Park

Royals: in Richmond Park

Scholars, scientists and engineers

Social reformers and political activists

Spiritual leaders

Sportsmen and sportswomen

Warriors and explorers

Writers and artists

References

History of the London Borough of Richmond upon Thames
Richmond